Fishia dispar is a moth in the family Noctuidae. It is found in North America, including Colorado and Utah.

Cuculliinae
Moths described in 1900